Ram Singh Yadav (c. 1943–2017) was an Indian politician and Congress MLA from Madhya Pradesh. He was also the Shivpuri district Congress President and died in office from a heart attack on 18 October 2017, aged 74. Known as 'Dadaji' and elected in the 2013 Assembly elections, he was survived by his wife and two children.

References

1940s births
2017 deaths
Madhya Pradesh MLAs 2013–2018
Indian National Congress politicians from Madhya Pradesh
People from Shivpuri district